Jean Alesi (born Giovanni Alesi, 11 June 1964) is a French professional racing driver of Italian origin. He competed in Formula One between 1989 and 2001, including spells at Tyrrell, Benetton, Sauber, Prost, Jordan and Ferrari, where he proved very popular among the Tifosi. He won the 1995 Canadian Grand Prix, but this proved to be the only win of his Formula One career. During his time in Formula One, Alesi was particularly good in the wet and was a mercurial and passionate racer, whose emotions sometimes got the better of him.

Born and raised in Avignon, Vaucluse, Alesi started karting at the age of 16 with a desire to eventually compete in rallying. He progressed to open-wheel car racing in 1983, participating in French Renault 5 Turbo. After winning the French Formula Three Championship in 1987, Alesi moved up to International Formula 3000 the year after. Despite the struggles during the inaugural season, his performances for the Jordan Formula 3000 team in the 1989 season led to a 1989 Formula One drive with Tyrrell Racing, replacing Michele Alboreto. Alesi eventually won the International Formula 3000 championship with three race wins, edging out his title rival with the same amount of points, Érik Comas.

After leaving Formula One, Alesi raced in the DTM championship from 2002 to 2006, winning some races with his best result being a fifth place in the drivers' championship. He raced in the Speedcar Series in 2008 and 2009 and raced at Le Mans in 2010. He raced in the Indianapolis 500 in 2012 and became the oldest professional driver to perform the rookie test for admission to the competition. For several years, he was also a commentator for the Italian TV show Pole Position. Alesi became a Knight of the Legion of Honour in 2006.

Early career
Alesi was born in the southern French town of Avignon, Vaucluse, between Montpellier and Marseille to Sicilian parents. His father, Franco, was from Alcamo, Sicily, and his mother was from Riesi. His father ran an automotive bodywork repair garage in the town, where Alesi spent much of his formative years and developed a love of cars. In addition to spending time in the family garage, Alesi's father also provided his first taste of motorsport, being a keen amateur competitor in rallying and hillclimb events. On weekends that he was unable to compete he would sometimes lend his rally cars to family friend and future Monte Carlo Rally-winning professional rally driver Jean Ragnotti, who would commonly return them "destroyed".

Starting his career with a passion for rallying rather than racing, he took up karting at the age of 16 and then graduated to cars in 1983 by entering the French Renault 5 Turbo championship, where he raced for two seasons. He won the 1987 French Formula 3 title before moving up to International Formula 3000 in 1988. The 1988 season was a disappointment, finishing tenth in the championship with two podium finishes, not helped by problems within the team. However, in 1989 he joined the Jordan Formula 3000 team and won the championship. Both crowns were after duels with his rival Érik Comas. In 1989 Alesi tied on points for the F3000 title with Comas, but won the title on number of wins, having scored three to Comas' two. Made the strong start with a street Ferrari F40 LM in Laguna Seca IMSA GTO race. Surprisingly led for six laps and finished third overall, ahead of most experienced drivers in race-spec cars. He also raced in the Le Mans 24 hours in the same year, but a fire forced him to retire in the fourth hour of the race.

Formula One career

Tyrrell
While Alesi was seen as a talent of the future, his start as a Formula One driver was somewhat fortuitous. Prior to the 1989 French Grand Prix, Ken Tyrrell had signed a deal to run Camel cigarette sponsorship on his previously unsponsored cars. However this caused problems for Michele Alboreto who was personally sponsored by rival cigarette brand Marlboro. The sponsorship clash forced Tyrrell to release Alboreto and find another driver. The team decided to look at whoever was leading International Formula 3000 at the time, and Alesi was signed as the replacement.

Alesi debuted in the 1989 French Grand Prix at Paul Ricard in a Tyrrell-Ford and finished fourth, having run as high as second during the race. Ken Tyrrell was sufficiently impressed to give him an eighteen-month contract. He drove most of the rest of the season for Tyrrell while continuing his successful Formula 3000 campaign, (occasionally giving the car up in favour of Johnny Herbert when Formula 3000 clashed), scoring points again at the Italian and Spanish Grands Prix.

With Jonathan Palmer having retired from driving at the end of 1989 and a new teammate in Satoru Nakajima, Alesi amazingly became Tyrrell's lead driver in 1990 for what would be his first full year in Grand Prix racing (prior to the start of the 1990 season, Alesi only had 8 race starts in Formula One). At the first event, the United States Grand Prix at Phoenix, he led for 25 laps in front of Ayrton Senna with a car powered by a customer Ford V8 considered as vastly inferior to the factory-developed Honda V10 in Senna's McLaren, and also re-passing Senna after the Brazilian had first overtaken for the lead, before ultimately finishing second. Second place in the Monaco Grand Prix followed, and by mid-season top teams were clamouring for his services in 1991. A confused situation erupted, with Tyrrell, Williams, and Ferrari all claiming to have signed the driver within a very short period. The results dropped away during the rest of the 1990 season, and Alesi finished ninth in the championship, with 13 points.

There were signs of Alesi's talent in the Italian Grand Prix at Monza where he qualified the under powered Tyrrell in 5th place less than a second slower than Senna's pole time. At both the original and restart (caused by Derek Warwick's Lotus crashing heavily), Alesi passed the more powerful V12 Ferrari of reigning World Champion Alain Prost for 3rd place and within a lap would be harrying McLaren's Gerhard Berger for 2nd. On lap 5, though, he spun into the barriers at the Rettifilo chicane.

Ferrari
1991

Alesi initially signed a contract with Williams for the 1991 season. However due to Williams delaying the announcement of his signature with the reasoning eventually given they were pursuing Ayrton Senna, Alesi eventually grew tired of the constant delays, as a result he then opted instead to sign for Ferrari as the second driver alongside fellow countryman Alain Prost, and the Ferrari team had to pay Williams a fine of four million dollars. The move to Ferrari initially appeared to be a logical choice from a results perspective too, for Alain Prost had mounted a serious world championship challenge at Ferrari the previous year, and the 1991 Ferrari set good lap times in winter testing.

He had third-place finishes at Monaco, Germany and Portugal, and finished in the top six at Brazil, France, Hungary and Spain (despite a stop and go penalty for a jump start in the Spanish Grand Prix). The 1991 Ferrari also turned out to be unreliable, and he had nine retirements during the season, including a mechanical failure while leading the Belgian Grand Prix. Having a dismal 1991 season, Alesi's teammate Prost was sacked after the Japanese Grand Prix when he publicly described the car as a "truck" and took a year-long sabbatical from racing, and thus Alesi became the team's number one driver for 1992. Alesi scored 21 points and finished seventh in the championship.

1992
Alesi was partnered by Ivan Capelli in 1992, when the Ferrari F92A was even further from the pace than the 1991 Ferrari. Capelli had a disastrous season and was replaced for the last two races by Nicola Larini. Alesi had no realistic hope of winning a race, and retired with engine failure in the first two races of the season, but he finished fourth in the third race of the season, behind the Williams drivers and Michael Schumacher. He finished third in the Spanish Grand Prix, after a strong wet-weather drive, in spite of making contact with Gerhard Berger and Mika Hakkinen during the race. He ran third at the San Marino Grand Prix, but retired following a collision with Gerhard Berger. The subsequent races brought a series of retirements, although Alesi had a strong third-place finish at Canada and produced another outstanding wet-weather drive in France, producing lap times on slicks that were comparable to those of Nigel Mansell's Williams, before retiring with another engine failure. In the Belgian Grand Prix he was given the F92A / T, an improvement over the previous model, but retired due to a collision with Nigel Mansell's Williams. He qualified a strong third at Monza, but retired with a fuel pump failure early in the race. He finished in the points during the last two races of the season, leaving him seventh in the championship with 18 points.

1993
Alesi was joined by Austrian Gerhard Berger in 1993 who was returning to Maranello after three seasons with McLaren. The Ferrari F93A was very slow during pre-season testing. Mainly due to the unreliability of the "active" suspension of the F93A, there came four retirements in the first five races of the season and an eighth-place finish at Brazil, causing Alesi to even consider leaving Ferrari. However, he finished third in the Monaco Grand Prix, and in July, he signed a further two-year contract with Ferrari. However, subsequent races continued to feature frequent retirements and finishes outside of the points. In Hungary he had a collision with Christian Fittipaldi, resulting in a leg contusion, and came close to having a brawl with him afterwards. The Ferrari improved towards the end of the season, and Alesi finished second at Monza and then led early in the race at Portugal, eventually finishing fourth. Alesi finished sixth in the championship with 16 points.

1994
In 1994, the Ferrari was far more competitive, but marred by unreliability, and team-mate Berger became established as the team leader. After finishing third in the first race of the season, Alesi injured his back after a testing accident at Mugello circuit in Italy after the first race of the  season (Brazil) and was replaced in the Pacific Grand Prix and the San Marino Grand Prix by Nicola Larini. He returned with a fifth place in Monaco and finished a strong third in Canada, but almost lost the position at the end of the race due to a gearbox problem. He retired in the French Grand Prix due to a collision with Rubens Barrichello, but finished second in the British Grand Prix, thanks to the disqualification of Michael Schumacher, and was looking set for a strong result in the German Grand Prix, qualifying second behind team-mate Berger, but his engine failed on the first lap. Subsequent races were marked by a series of retirements. At Monza, he took his first pole position and led until his first pit stop, when his gearbox failed in the pitlane, and in anger, he drove back to Avignon at speeds in excess of 200 km/h. This streak finally ended at Japan, when he finished third after a duel with Nigel Mansell's Williams, and then he finished sixth at Australia. Alesi finished fifth in the championship with 24 points.

1995

The Ferrari improved further in 1995 and Alesi achieved better results, although the pace of the Ferrari fell back during the second half of the season. He finished fifth at Brazil, followed by second places at Argentina and Imola. He retired from second place at the Spanish Grand Prix due to an engine failure, and at the Monaco Grand Prix, again while running second, Martin Brundle's Ligier spun in front of him, leaving him nowhere to go and causing him to crash. However, at the Canadian Grand Prix, on his 31st birthday, he won his first and only race, helped by Michael Schumacher encountering mechanical problems with ten laps to go. Alesi was unaware that he was in the lead for some time, as the mechanics didn't have enough time to put out his new position. Alesi realized what happened after he saw people getting up in the stands. Ferrari confirmed it with a P1 panel as he was passing through the pit lane. Overwhelmed by emotions, when Alesi was braking into Turn 1, he had tears in his eyes, making it difficult to drive in the right line. His Ferrari ran out of fuel after crossing the finish line and so got a lift back to the pits off Michael Schumacher. This broke the record for the largest number of consecutive races without a win for a Ferrari driver (67) which was subsequently exceeded by Felipe Massa in 2013. He finished second at the British Grand Prix, but then suffered four consecutive retirements, and was devastated prior to the Hungarian Grand Prix when hearing that he had lost his Ferrari drive to Michael Schumacher. He retired from the lead four laps into the Belgian Grand Prix due to a suspension failure, and retired from the lead again at the Italian Grand Prix, seven laps from the end, due to a rear wheel problem. He had a heated argument with Jean Todt after the Portuguese Grand Prix due to refusing to obey team orders to defer to team-mate Gerhard Berger in spite of having more points in the championship. At the European Grand Prix Alesi led for most of the race due to fast laps on slick tyres in damp conditions, but was passed by Michael Schumacher two laps from the end, hindered by low fuel and trouble progressing through lapped traffic. After a fifth place in the Pacific Grand Prix, he produced an outstanding wet-weather drive in Japan, making a powerful comeback after being angered by a stop-go penalty for a jump start that he felt he did not commit, but then retired with a driveshaft failure, and he crashed into Michael Schumacher in his final race for Ferrari at Australia. He finished fifth in the drivers' championship, with 42 points.

Benetton
1996
When Benetton's Michael Schumacher joined Ferrari in 1996, Alesi and teammate Gerhard Berger swapped places with him, with Berger not happy to be the number two to Schumacher at Ferrari. Though Benetton were the defending constructors' champions, they were about to experience a lull in form like Ferrari in 1991. Many team personnel had decided to leave for Ferrari with Michael Schumacher, and chief designer Rory Byrne decided to take a year out. The 1996 Benetton was fairly successful but slower than the Williams, and lost competitiveness through the season, lacking effective developments to the car, while the Ferrari improved as the season progressed, resulting in Schumacher overtaking Alesi in the drivers' championship. His season began with a collision with the Ferrari of Eddie Irvine, but two podiums followed. After a bad start due to the car's braking system, he collided with Mika Salo in the fourth race of the season and he and team-mate Berger were summoned by team boss Flavio Briatore, and they were told, 'No more errors', and this generated tension within the team. After a sixth place at Imola, he was leading the Monaco Grand Prix but retired due to a broken suspension. He then had five podium finishes, sandwiching a retirement at the British Grand Prix after having run in second place. At the Italian Grand Prix, following the retirement of Damon Hill, he led until the pit stops, when he was overtaken by Michael Schumacher, who had a better race strategy. After a fourth place at Portugal and retirement in the last race, Alesi finished fourth in the drivers' championship with 47 points, the best result of his career.

1997
At the start of the 1997 season, Alesi was given an ultimatum from Flavio Briatore, warning him that 1997 would be his last chance to get good results. The car produced good results in pre-season testing, but Ross Brawn, Nigel Stepney and Rory Byrne joined Schumacher at Ferrari, and the Benetton's form during the season was erratic. His cause was not helped by an embarrassing retirement in the season-opening Australian Grand Prix in  when he ignored several radio messages from the pit mechanics to come in for his pit stop, and continued for five laps until running out of fuel and was criticised by Briatore, who felt he had wasted a chance of a podium finish. He only scored three points in the following four races, but then had a strong run with some podiums, moving up into third place in the drivers' championship. However, there were further embarrassing incidents, such as at the French Grand Prix when he needlessly pushed David Coulthard off the track, and the Austrian Grand Prix, where his attempt to outbrake Eddie Irvine from nearly eight lengths behind caused a collision that saw Alesi placed under investigation for dangerous driving after the race. He took pole position at the Italian Grand Prix which sent the fans into raptures despite the fact that he no longer drove for Ferrari and led early in the race but lost out to David Coulthard's McLaren due to a slow pit stop. He finished fourth in the championship with 36 points, thanks to the disqualification of Michael Schumacher at the end of the season. Alesi's reputation was damaged during his spell at Benetton, having failed to win a Grand Prix despite having had a competitive car, and suffered by comparison with Schumacher at Ferrari. Alesi's contract with Benetton was not renewed at the end of the season and he signed a two-year contract with Sauber.

Sauber
1998
Alesi moved on to the Swiss team Sauber, and was paired with Johnny Herbert and they went on to form the most experienced driver line-up for the 1998 season. The car was equipped with Ferrari engines from 1997, which were evolved from Petronas. Although Alesi's results declined relative to previous years, his reputation improved again, for he put in many strong performances that masked the deficiencies of his Sauber. He had a poor first race of the season in Melbourne, which ended in an engine failure, and a ninth place in Brazil, but he showed good form in the 1998 Grand Prix of Argentina, finishing fifth despite a pit stop problem early in the race. He finished sixth at Imola, but then was plagued by unreliability during the middle part of the season, despite often running in points-scoring positions, including a retirement from fourth place near the end of the Monaco Grand Prix, and being hit by Heinz-Harald Frentzen while running in sixth during the French Grand Prix, and a hydraulic failure forced him to retire after running fourth during the British Grand Prix. He qualified on the front row at the Austrian Grand Prix, but a collision with Giancarlo Fisichella forced him to retire. He achieved the last podium of his career at the rain-soaked Belgian Grand Prix, behind the Jordans of Damon Hill and Ralf Schumacher. He also scored points at the Italian Grand Prix, and finished in eleventh place in the drivers' championship with nine points, comprehensively beating team-mate Johnny Herbert.

1999

The 1999 Sauber was slower and less reliable than the previous year's, and he had to retire immediately in the first Grand Prix of the season, and also retired in the Brazilian Grand Prix, albeit after having worked his way up to 5th position from 21st on the grid. His first points came in the third race of the season, with a sixth-place finish. At the Canadian Grand Prix he was angered by an incident with Jarno Trulli and, despite the good relationship between the two drivers, accused Trulli of not behaving as a professional driver. He had several other retirements following some good qualifying performances including a front row position at the French Grand Prix, thanks to a wet qualifying session. During the summer, he was named as a possible replacement for Eddie Irvine as the number two Ferrari driver alongside Michael Schumacher, and Schumacher said that he would be happy to have Alesi in the team Ferrari opted to sign Rubens Barrichello for the second seat, closing the door on a possible return for Alesi. Eventually, he signed for Prost Grand Prix and accused the engineers of Sauber of not developing the car or following the advice of the drivers. Shortly before the Hungarian Grand Prix, Alesi had an accident that caused bruises to his right leg and almost caused him to miss the race, but he did take part. He had another sixth place at the last race of the season, leaving him sixteenth in the championship with two points.

Prost

For the 2000 season, Alesi moved on to join Prost, which was owned by his former Ferrari teammate and four time World Drivers' Champion Alain Prost, after Prost had bought the Ligier team in early 1997 and renamed it. However, the car was very slow and unreliable. He was hit by a billboard in qualifying for the Brazilian Grand Prix, resulting in an accident, but came out unscathed. He failed to score a single point during the season, for the first time in his career. Late in the season, he criticised the car and the Peugeot engines, so much so that in the French Grand Prix, the technicians of the Transalpine went on strike for five minutes. A bad accident in the German Grand Prix threatened his ability to race at the subsequent Grand Prix in Hungary, but he was able to take part.

In 2001 the Prost car was reliable and he finished every race that he drove for the Prost team. He got into a points-scoring position at the wet Brazilian Grand Prix but his tyres went off and consequently he dropped to eighth place. Alesi scored his first points since the 1999 season at the Monaco Grand Prix, with a sixth place, and then finished fifth at the Canadian Grand Prix. A dispute after the British Grand Prix, however, saw Alesi walk out after the German Grand Prix, where he scored a point. This was because German driver Heinz-Harald Frentzen was suddenly sacked by Jordan after the British Grand Prix and needed a drive. He joined the Prost team, and Alesi joined Jordan. Alesi was fined and criticised by Prost, who had given him a two-year contract and did not want to lose his number one driver.

Jordan
Alesi ended his open-wheel career in 2001 with Jordan. Alesi had driven for Jordan in Formula 3000 when he won the championship in 1989. He drove the remaining five races of 2001 for Jordan, scoring his last Formula one points in Belgium by finishing sixth. Alesi made his 200th Formula One start in 2001 United States Grand Prix and finished his F1 career at the 2001 Japanese Grand Prix, where he retired after colliding with Kimi Räikkönen on lap 5. However, he was generally outpaced by team-mate Jarno Trulli, and the team opted to take on Takuma Sato instead for 2002. Although Alesi was offered a drive with Arrows, he did not want to race for another season in an uncompetitive car, and so decided to retire from Formula One.

Post-Formula One career

Test drive with McLaren 2002
In March 2002, Alesi – who was set to drive for Mercedes that season in DTM – was recruited by McLaren to work on tyre development, managing 224 laps over three days at Paul Ricard in a 2001-spec McLaren-Mercedes MP4-16B, before staying on to have a run in his new Merc CLK-DTM racer.

Alesi tested again for McLaren at Mugello in April that same year, putting 90 laps on the board, and was in discussions to become the team's official test driver. It never happened, with Alesi going on to spend five seasons in the DTM with Mercedes instead, and later holding F1-related ambassadorial roles with both Lotus and Pirelli.

DTM 2002–2006
After Formula One, Alesi raced in the German Touring Car Championship, where he placed fifth in the 2002 championship for Mercedes with one victory. He repeated this in 2003 but this time scoring two victories. In 2004 he finished seventh in the championship scoring no victories. In 2005 he won the opening race and went on to take seventh place in the standings once more. He retired from the DTM after finishing the 2006 season in 9th place.

2002 – 5th in the championship, 1 victory,
2003 – 5th, 2 victories,
2004 – 7th,
2005 – 7th, 1 victory,
2006 – 9th

Direxiv
Alesi was an active spokesman for the Direxiv team in their bid for entry to the 2008 Formula 1 series. It was planned as a McLaren B Team with backing and engines from Mercedes. However, the proposal was beaten to the final grid place by Prodrive.

Speedcar Series 2008–2009
Alesi joined a number of other ex-Formula One drivers (Christian Danner, Johnny Herbert, Stefan Johansson, Ukyo Katayama, JJ Lehto, Gianni Morbidelli, Jacques Villeneuve and Alex Yoong) in the inaugural season of the Far & Middle Eastern Speedcar Series. He won two races and finished 4th in the championship. He finished fifth in the second and last season of Speedcar Series after taking two wins in 2009.
2008 - 4th, 2 victories
2009 - 5th, 2 victories

Le Mans Series 2010–
On 13 October 2009, Alesi tested an AF Corse Ferrari F430 GT2 at Maranello, on the same day that Felipe Massa drove an F1 car for the first time after his accident in Hungary earlier in the year. After the test, which lasted just 65 laps, Alesi was enthusiastic and Amato Ferrari talked about Alesi's possible involvement in the 2010 programme.

Early in 2010 it was announced that Alesi would be the team-mate of another ex-F1 Ferrari driver, Giancarlo Fisichella, in the Le Mans Series GT2 class in Ferrari's AF Corse team. In the first two races Alesi and his team-mates Fisichella and Finn Toni Vilander finished on the podium. Alesi, Fisichella and Vilander raced in the Le Mans 24 h race for AF Corse and finished 4th in their class. In the third race of the season in Algarve the trio finished in second position and at the Hungaroring they finished in fourth place. They finished second in the championship.

Lotus 2011–
In January 2011, along with the launch of their new car, Lotus Renault GP announced that they had hired Alesi as an ambassador for the team and test driver for the T125 single-seater project. In September, Alesi announced that he will attempt to qualify for the 2012 Indianapolis 500, in a car powered by a Lotus-badged engine.

On an episode during season 17 of the BBC TV show Top Gear, Alesi helped presenter Jeremy Clarkson test one of the Lotus T125 single seaters.

Indianapolis 500
In April 2012, Alesi announced his intent to race in the 2012 Indianapolis 500 with a Lotus engine. Deals with former IZOD IndyCar Series team Newman/Haas Racing fell through, and HVM Racing owner Keith Wiggins said that his team didn't have the funding to run Alesi in the 500. However, Firestone Indy Lights team Fan Force United agreed to field Alesi in the 500 where he qualified 33rd. His Lotus-powered car, along with that of fellow Lotus driver Simona de Silvestro, was so severely underpowered as to be unable to maintain sufficient pace in the race, and both were forced to park their cars after less than a dozen completed laps.

On 18 December 2012, Alesi unofficially announced his intention to quit racing when, in an interview with L'Equipe, he conceded that for next year he had given up on finding the sponsorship required for a second attempt.

Pirelli 2013–
In 2013 Alesi became an ambassador for Pirelli.

Driving style
During his spell at Ferrari from 1991 to 1995, his aggressive driving style, combined with the use of the number 27 on his car, led to comparisons with Gilles Villeneuve.

Helmet
His helmet is white with black and red lines going down on the front side of the helmet with his name written, being an homage to Elio de Angelis, in addition to a deep blue top section. In 1999, his helmet changed from white to silver, owing to one of Sauber's sponsors being Red Bull.

Personal life
Alesi is a wine connoisseur and has a vineyard near his hometown of Avignon, where he resides with his wife, Japanese model, actress and pop singer Kumiko Goto, and their three children, including daughter Helena, who is studying in London. His son Giuliano Alesi competed in the 2019 FIA Formula 2 Championship with Trident Racing.

Alesi is a fan of Italian football team Juventus.

In 2006, Alesi was awarded Knight in France's Legion of Honour.

Racing record

Career summary

Complete International Formula 3000 results
(key) (Races in bold indicate pole position) (Races in italics indicate fastest lap)

* – Alesi won the 1989 title on countback, winning three races to Érik Comas' two.

Complete Japanese Formula 3000 results
(key) (Races in bold indicate pole position; races in italics indicate fastest lap)

Complete Formula One results
(key) (Races in bold indicate pole position; races in italics indicate fastest lap)
{| class="wikitable" style="text-align:center; font-size:90%"
! Year
! Team
! Chassis
! Engine
! 1
! 2
! 3
! 4
! 5
! 6
! 7
! 8
! 9
! 10
! 11
! 12
! 13
! 14
! 15
! 16
! 17
! WDC
! Points
|-
| 1989
! Tyrrell Racing Organisation
! Tyrrell 018
! Cosworth V8
| BRA
| SMR
| MON
| MEX
| USA
| CAN|style="background:#DFFFDF;"| FRA
|style="background:#EFCFFF;"| GBR
|style="background:#CFCFFF;"| GER
|style="background:#CFCFFF;"| HUN
| BEL
|style="background:#DFFFDF;"| ITA
| POR
|style="background:#DFFFDF;"| ESP
|style="background:#EFCFFF;"| JPN
|style="background:#EFCFFF;"| AUS
|
! 9th
! 8
|-
|rowspan=2| 1990
!rowspan=2| Tyrrell Racing Organisation
! Tyrrell 018
!rowspan=2| Cosworth V8
|style="background:#DFDFDF;"| USA
|style="background:#CFCFFF;"| BRA
|
|
|
|
|
|
|
|
|
|
|
|
|
|
|
!rowspan=2| 9th
!rowspan=2| 13
|-
! Tyrrell 019
|
|
|style="background:#DFFFDF;"| SMR
|style="background:#DFDFDF;"| MON
|style="background:#EFCFFF;"| CAN
|style="background:#CFCFFF;"| MEX
|style="background:#EFCFFF;"| FRA
|style="background:#CFCFFF;"| GBR
|style="background:#CFCFFF;"| GER
|style="background:#EFCFFF;"| HUN
|style="background:#CFCFFF;"| BEL
|style="background:#EFCFFF;"| ITA
|style="background:#CFCFFF;"| POR
|style="background:#EFCFFF;"| ESP
|style="background:#FFFFFF;"| JPN
|style="background:#CFCFFF;"| AUS
|
|-
|rowspan=2| 1991
!rowspan=2| Scuderia Ferrari SpA
! Ferrari 642/2
!rowspan=2| Ferrari V12
|style="background:#CFCFFF;"| USA
|style="background:#DFFFDF;"| BRA
|style="background:#EFCFFF;"| SMR
|style="background:#FFDF9F;"| MON
|style="background:#EFCFFF;"| CAN
|
|
|
|
|
|
|
|
|
|
|
|
!rowspan=2| 7th
!rowspan=2| 21
|-
! Ferrari 643
|
|
|
|
|
|style="background:#EFCFFF;"| MEX
|style="background:#DFFFDF;"| FRA
|style="background:#EFCFFF;"| GBR
|style="background:#FFDF9F;"| GER
|style="background:#DFFFDF;"| HUN
|style="background:#EFCFFF;"| BEL
|style="background:#EFCFFF;"| ITA
|style="background:#FFDF9F;"| POR
|style="background:#DFFFDF;"| ESP
|style="background:#EFCFFF;"| JPN
|style="background:#EFCFFF;"| AUS
|
|-
|rowspan=2| 1992
!rowspan=2| Scuderia Ferrari SpA
! Ferrari F92A
!rowspan=2| Ferrari V12
|style="background:#EFCFFF;"| RSA
|style="background:#EFCFFF;"| MEX
|style="background:#DFFFDF;"| BRA
|style="background:#FFDF9F;"| ESP
|style="background:#EFCFFF;"| SMR
|style="background:#EFCFFF;"| MON
|style="background:#FFDF9F;"| CAN
|style="background:#EFCFFF;"| FRA
|style="background:#EFCFFF;"| GBR
|style="background:#DFFFDF;"| GER
|style="background:#EFCFFF;"| HUN
|
|
|
|
|
|
!rowspan=2| 7th
!rowspan=2| 18
|-
! Ferrari F92AT
|
|
|
|
|
|
|
|
|
|
|
|style="background:#EFCFFF;"| BEL
|style="background:#EFCFFF;"| ITA
|style="background:#EFCFFF;"| POR
|style="background:#DFFFDF;"| JPN
|style="background:#DFFFDF;"| AUS
|
|-
| 1993
! Scuderia Ferrari
! Ferrari F93A
! Ferrari V12
|style="background:#EFCFFF;"| RSA
|style="background:#CFCFFF;"| BRA
|style="background:#EFCFFF;"| EUR
|style="background:#EFCFFF;"| SMR
|style="background:#EFCFFF;"| ESP
|style="background:#FFDF9F;"| MON
|style="background:#EFCFFF;"| CAN
|style="background:#EFCFFF;"| FRA
|style="background:#CFCFFF;"| GBR
|style="background:#CFCFFF;"| GER
|style="background:#EFCFFF;"| HUN
|style="background:#EFCFFF;"| BEL
|style="background:#DFDFDF;"| ITA
|style="background:#DFFFDF;"| POR
|style="background:#EFCFFF;"| JPN
|style="background:#DFFFDF;"| AUS
|
! 6th
! 16
|-
|rowspan=2| 1994
!rowspan=2| Scuderia Ferrari
! Ferrari 412T1
!rowspan=2| Ferrari V12
|style="background:#FFDF9F;"| BRA
| PAC
| SMR
|style="background:#DFFFDF;"| MON
|style="background:#DFFFDF;"| ESP
|style="background:#FFDF9F;"| CAN
|
|
|
|
|
|
|
|
|
|
|
!rowspan=2| 5th
!rowspan=2| 24
|-
! Ferrari 412T1B
|
|
|
|
|
|
|style="background:#EFCFFF;"| FRA
|style="background:#DFDFDF;"| GBR
|style="background:#EFCFFF;"| GER
|style="background:#EFCFFF;"| HUN
|style="background:#EFCFFF;"| BEL
|style="background:#EFCFFF;"| ITA|style="background:#EFCFFF;"| POR
|style="background:#CFCFFF;"| EUR
|style="background:#FFDF9F;"| JPN
|style="background:#DFFFDF;"| AUS
|
|-
| 1995
! Scuderia Ferrari
! Ferrari 412T2
! Ferrari V12
|style="background:#DFFFDF;"| BRA
|style="background:#DFDFDF;"| ARG
|style="background:#DFDFDF;"| SMR
|style="background:#EFCFFF;"| ESP
|style="background:#EFCFFF;"| MON
|style="background:#FFFFBF;"| CAN
|style="background:#DFFFDF;"| FRA
|style="background:#DFDFDF;"| GBR
|style="background:#EFCFFF;"| GER
|style="background:#EFCFFF;"| HUN
|style="background:#EFCFFF;"| BEL
|style="background:#EFCFFF;"| ITA
|style="background:#DFFFDF;"| POR
|style="background:#DFDFDF;"| EUR
|style="background:#DFFFDF;"| PAC
|style="background:#EFCFFF;"| JPN
|style="background:#EFCFFF;"| AUS
! 5th
! 42
|-
| 1996
! Mild Seven Benetton Renault
! Benetton B196
! Renault V10
|style="background:#EFCFFF;"| AUS
|style="background:#DFDFDF;"| BRA
|style="background:#FFDF9F;"| ARG
|style="background:#EFCFFF;"| EUR
|style="background:#DFFFDF;"| SMR
|style="background:#EFCFFF;"| MON
|style="background:#DFDFDF;"| ESP
|style="background:#FFDF9F;"| CAN
|style="background:#FFDF9F;"| FRA
|style="background:#EFCFFF;"| GBR
|style="background:#DFDFDF;"| GER
|style="background:#FFDF9F;"| HUN
|style="background:#DFFFDF;"| BEL
|style="background:#DFDFDF;"| ITA
|style="background:#DFFFDF;"| POR
|style="background:#EFCFFF;"| JPN
|
! 4th
! 47
|-
| 1997
! Mild Seven Benetton Renault
! Benetton B197
! Renault V10
|style="background:#EFCFFF;"| AUS
|style="background:#DFFFDF;"| BRA
|style="background:#CFCFFF;"| ARG
|style="background:#DFFFDF;"| SMR
|style="background:#EFCFFF;"| MON
|style="background:#FFDF9F;"| ESP
|style="background:#DFDFDF;"| CAN
|style="background:#DFFFDF;"| FRA
|style="background:#DFDFDF;"| GBR
|style="background:#DFFFDF;"| GER
|style="background:#CFCFFF;"| HUN
|style="background:#CFCFFF;"| BEL
|style="background:#DFDFDF;"| ITA|style="background:#EFCFFF;"| AUT
|style="background:#DFDFDF;"| LUX
|style="background:#DFFFDF;"| JPN
|style="background:#CFCFFF;"| EUR
! 4th
! 36
|-
| 1998
! Red Bull Sauber Petronas
! Sauber C17
! Petronas V10
|style="background:#EFCFFF;"| AUS
|style="background:#CFCFFF;"| BRA
|style="background:#DFFFDF;"| ARG
|style="background:#DFFFDF;"| SMR
|style="background:#CFCFFF;"| ESP
|style="background:#CFCFFF;"| MON
|style="background:#EFCFFF;"| CAN
|style="background:#CFCFFF;"| FRA
|style="background:#EFCFFF;"| GBR
|style="background:#EFCFFF;"| AUT
|style="background:#CFCFFF;"| GER
|style="background:#CFCFFF;"| HUN
|style="background:#FFDF9F;"| BEL
|style="background:#DFFFDF;"| ITA
|style="background:#CFCFFF;"| LUX
|style="background:#CFCFFF;"| JPN
|
! 11th
! 9
|-
| 1999
! Red Bull Sauber Petronas
! Sauber C18
! Petronas V10
|style="background:#EFCFFF;"| AUS
|style="background:#EFCFFF;"| BRA
|style="background:#DFFFDF;"| SMR
|style="background:#EFCFFF;"| MON
|style="background:#EFCFFF;"| ESP
|style="background:#EFCFFF;"| CAN
|style="background:#EFCFFF;"| FRA
|style="background:#CFCFFF;"| GBR
|style="background:#EFCFFF;"| AUT
|style="background:#CFCFFF;"| GER
|style="background:#CFCFFF;"| HUN
|style="background:#CFCFFF;"| BEL
|style="background:#CFCFFF;"| ITA
|style="background:#EFCFFF;"| EUR
|style="background:#CFCFFF;"| MAL
|style="background:#DFFFDF;"| JPN
|
! 15th
! 2
|-
| 2000
! Gauloises Prost Peugeot
! Prost AP03
! Peugeot V10
|style="background:#EFCFFF;"| AUS
|style="background:#EFCFFF;"| BRA
|style="background:#EFCFFF;"| SMR
|style="background:#CFCFFF;"| GBR
|style="background:#EFCFFF;"| ESP
|style="background:#CFCFFF;"| EUR
|style="background:#EFCFFF;"| MON
|style="background:#EFCFFF;"| CAN
|style="background:#CFCFFF;"| FRA
|style="background:#EFCFFF;"| AUT
|style="background:#EFCFFF;"| GER
|style="background:#EFCFFF;"| HUN
|style="background:#EFCFFF;"| BEL
|style="background:#CFCFFF;"| ITA
|style="background:#EFCFFF;"| USA
|style="background:#EFCFFF;"| JPN
|style="background:#CFCFFF;"| MAL
! NC
! 0
|-
|rowspan=2| 2001
! Prost Acer
! Prost AP04
! Acer V10
|style="background:#CFCFFF;"| AUS
|style="background:#CFCFFF;"| MAL
|style="background:#CFCFFF;"| BRA
|style="background:#CFCFFF;"| SMR
|style="background:#CFCFFF;"| ESP
|style="background:#CFCFFF;"| AUT
|style="background:#DFFFDF;"| MON
|style="background:#DFFFDF;"| CAN
|style="background:#CFCFFF;"| EUR
|style="background:#CFCFFF;"| FRA
|style="background:#CFCFFF;"| GBR
|style="background:#DFFFDF;"| GER
|
|
|
|
|
!rowspan=2| 15th
!rowspan=2| 5
|-
! B&H Jordan Honda
! Jordan EJ11
! Honda V10
|
|
|
|
|
|
|
|
|
|
|
|
|style="background:#CFCFFF;"| HUN
|style="background:#DFFFDF;"| BEL
|style="background:#CFCFFF;"| ITA
|style="background:#CFCFFF;"| USA
|style="background:#EFCFFF;"| JPN
|}

24 Hours of Le Mans results

Complete Deutsche Tourenwagen Masters results
(key) (Races in bold' indicate pole position) (Races in italics'' indicate fastest lap)

1 - Shanghai was a non-championship round.

Complete American open-wheel racing results
(key)

IndyCar Series

Indianapolis 500

See also

 Legion of Honour
 Legion of Honour Museum 
 List of Legion of Honour recipients by name (A)
 Ribbons of the French military and civil awards

References

External links

 Jean ALESI - Vin Côte du Rhône "Clos du de l'Hermitage" un vin d'exception Jean Alesi's vineyard website 
 Jean Alesi official Fans Club "Italia" 
 

1964 births
Living people
24 Hours of Le Mans drivers
Benetton Formula One drivers
Chevaliers of the Légion d'honneur
Deutsche Tourenwagen Masters drivers
European Le Mans Series drivers
Ferrari Formula One drivers
Formula One race winners
French Formula One drivers
French Formula Three Championship drivers
French people of Sicilian descent
French racing drivers
Indianapolis 500 drivers
International Formula 3000 drivers
International Formula 3000 Champions
IndyCar Series drivers
Japanese Formula 3000 Championship drivers
Jordan Formula One drivers
Sportspeople from Avignon
Prost Formula One drivers
Sauber Formula One drivers
Speedcar Series drivers
Tyrrell Formula One drivers
HWA Team drivers
AF Corse drivers
Oreca drivers
Mercedes-AMG Motorsport drivers
David Price Racing drivers
Graff Racing drivers